

Number format
Fixed Land line +962 6 555 5555
   +962 Jordan   6  city Amman  ..# .
Mobile phones  +962 79 999 9999
    +962 Jordan   7X operator ID

Local area codes
 2 Northern Area (Irbid, Ajloun, Jerash, Mafraq)
 3 Southern Area (Tafilah, Karak, Ma'an, Aqaba, Petra)
 5 Zarqa
 6 Amman
 7 Mobile Phones
 75× Friendi
 77x Orange
 78x Umniah
 79x Zain
8 Free Lines
9 Service Lines

See also 
 Telecommunications in Jordan

References

ITU allocations list

Jordan
Telecommunications in Jordan
Jordan communications-related lists